Kodangudi (North) is a village in the Udayarpalayam taluk of Ariyalur district, Tamil Nadu, India.

Demographics 

As per the 2001 census, Kodangudi (North) had a total population of 1345 with 686 males and 659 females.

References 

Villages in Ariyalur district